

C

C